Little Black Bear First Nation ( kaskitêw-maskwa-maskosis) is a Cree and Assiniboine First Nation in southern Saskatchewan, Canada. Their reserves include:
 Little Black Bear 84
 Little Black Bear 84SC
 Treaty Four Reserve Grounds 77, shared with 32 other bands.

References

First Nations in Saskatchewan